Carlos Emanuel Soares Tavares (born 23 April 1985), known as Carlitos, is a Cape Verdean professional footballer who plays as a right or left back.

Club career
Born in Almada, Setúbal District, Carlitos played the vast majority of his career in the lower levels of Portuguese football. His first Segunda Liga experience (of only three) occurred with Portimonense S.C. in the 2007–08 season (six starts, team finished in tenth position).

In the summer of 2011, Carlitos moved to the Cypriot First Division, where he spent several years in representation of AEL Limassol. On 3 July 2015, he signed a two-year contract with Super League Greece club Iraklis Thessaloniki FC.

Carlitos returned to Cyprus and its top flight on 4 January 2016, when he joined AC Omonia. He scored his first and only for the side roughly one year later, when he headed home in a 2–1 away loss against Apollon Limassol FC, and after 51 competitive appearances he was released on 26 May 2017.

Personal life
Carlitos' cousin, Nani, was also a footballer. He represented mainly Sporting CP, Manchester United and Portugal.

Career statistics

Club

Honours
Barreirense
Segunda Divisão: 2004–05

AEL Limassol
Cypriot First Division: 2011–12

References

External links

1985 births
Living people
Sportspeople from Almada
Portuguese sportspeople of Cape Verdean descent
Citizens of Cape Verde through descent
Cape Verdean footballers
Portuguese footballers
Association football defenders
Liga Portugal 2 players
Segunda Divisão players
Amora F.C. players
F.C. Barreirense players
Odivelas F.C. players
Imortal D.C. players
Portimonense S.C. players
G.D. Chaves players
Atlético Clube de Portugal players
Real S.C. players
Casa Pia A.C. players
Cypriot First Division players
AEL Limassol players
AC Omonia players
Super League Greece players
Iraklis Thessaloniki F.C. players
Cape Verde international footballers
2013 Africa Cup of Nations players
2015 Africa Cup of Nations players
Cape Verdean expatriate footballers
Portuguese expatriate footballers
Expatriate footballers in Cyprus
Expatriate footballers in Greece
Portuguese expatriate sportspeople in Cyprus